Catali was the name of a tribe belonging to the Venetic peoples that are sometimes confused with Illyrians. They were an ancient people who inhabited north-eastern Italy, in an area corresponding to the modern-day region of the Veneto.

References 

Adriatic Veneti